Jeffrey Wray Nicholas Nady (born February 15, 1990) is an American football tackle who is currently the offensive line coach for the Nevada Wolf Pack. He was signed by the Jacksonville Jaguars as an undrafted free agent in 2013. He played college football at Nevada.

Nady has also played for the Atlanta Falcons and Spokane Shock of the Arena Football League.

Early years
Nady was a two-year letterwinner in football at Douglas High School. He helped his team to Sierra League championship in 2007 and was first-team all-league and all-region as a defensive lineman, and was first-team all-league, all-region and all-state as a punter.
He was a three-year letterman in basketball and was a three-time all-region selection on the hardwood.

College career
Nady attended the University of Nevada, Reno where he earned ALL-WAC accolades in his junior and senior seasons with the Wolf Pack. He was named to Outland Trophy and Lombardi Award watch lists in July 2012 prior to the start of his senior season.

Professional career

Jacksonville Jaguars
Nady signed with Jacksonville on April 27, 2013. He was released on May 16, 2013.

Atlanta Falcons
Following his release from Jacksonville, Nady signed with Atlanta on August 9, 2013. He played in his first professional game against the Baltimore Ravens on August 15, 2013. He was released on August 26, 2013.

Spokane Shock
After his release from Atlanta, Nady caught on with the Spokane Shock of the Arena Football League where he was later released.

San Jose SaberCats
Nady was assigned to San Jose in March 2014 where he is playing fullback and offensive line for the SaberCats. Nady scored his first professional touchdown, a three-yard catch, June 29, 2014 against the Arizona Rattlers.

Las Vegas Outlaws
On December 22, 2014, Nady was drafted by the Las Vegas Outlaws in the 2014 Expansion Draft.

Coaching career
In August 2016, Nady joined the football coaching staff as an assistant coach at the University of Nevada, Reno.

Personal life
Nady is the son of Joe and Cleo Nady, has an older brother, Joe, and older sister, Tobie Whipple. His father and uncle Andy Hargrove played baseball at Nevada, his uncle Jay Nady played football at Nevada and his cousin is Major League Baseball player Xavier Nady.

References

1990 births
Living people
American football offensive tackles
Fort Lewis Skyhawks football coaches
Nevada Wolf Pack football coaches
Nevada Wolf Pack football players
Las Vegas Outlaws (arena football) players
People from Douglas County, Nevada
San Jose SaberCats players
Spokane Shock players
Sportspeople from Reno, Nevada